Spotted Tail Creek is a stream in Keya Paha County, Nebraska, in the United States.

Spotted Tail Creek was named for Spotted Tail, a Brulé Lakota tribal chief.

See also
List of rivers of Nebraska

References

Rivers of Keya Paha County, Nebraska
Rivers of Nebraska